Shilka may refer to:
Shilka (river), a river in Zabaykalsky Krai, Russia
Shilka (town), a town in Zabaykalsky Krai, Russia
Shilka, alternative name of ZSU-23-4 Shilka, a Russian self-propelled radar-guided anti-aircraft weapon system

See also
 Shilkinsky (disambiguation)